Rolf Paetz (24 November 1922 – 19 April 1994) was a German footballer who played as a forward for Hannover 96.

Honours
 German football championship: 1954

External links
 
 

1922 births
1994 deaths
German footballers
Association football forwards
Hannover 96 players
Hannover 96 managers
Bundesliga managers
Place of birth missing
German football managers